, released in North America as T.R.A.G.: Tactical Rescue Assault Group - Mission of Mercy (or simply T.R.A.G.), is a video game for the Sony PlayStation. It is an action-adventure game developed and published by Sunsoft.

Plot
The T.R.A.G. team infiltrates the Togusa building, which has been taken over by terrorists, and they attempt to take it back, as well as rescue Professor Kevin Howard, an important scientist who is a hostage of the terrorists.

Gameplay
The gameplay is somewhat similar to that of Resident Evil, with 3D characters moving across pre-rendered backgrounds most of the time.

Characters
There are 4 playable characters, each with a unique ability and also a different fighting style:

Alex is a member of T.R.A.G. who is able to use night vision goggles and fights using his pistol.
Michelle is Alex's comrade who fights with a knife.
Rachel Howard is Professor Howard's daughter who fights with tonfa batons. Her small size allows her to get in tight places.
Burns Byford is a local detective who was searching for one of the terrorists, Gasshu. He fights with his fists. His strength allows him to move heavy objects that the other characters cannot.

Each character can be switched with another one almost anytime; if the characters are split into two teams, the player is able to explore two areas separately as well. It's notable that there are no new weapons to be picked up during the main game; instead those are obtained only as unlockables after the game's completion.

Release 
The game was released in Japan on December 3, 1998 for the PlayStation game console. In Japan, it was later re-released under the PlayStation the Best label in 2000, as well as the value 1500 label in 2001. The game was released emulated on the PlayStation Network as a PS one Classic in Japan on March 29, 2007.

Reception

The game received mixed reviews according to the review aggregation website GameRankings.

See also 
Deep Freeze

References

External links
 

1998 video games
Action-adventure games
PlayStation (console) games
PlayStation Network games
Science fiction video games
Sunsoft games
Single-player video games
Terrorism in fiction
Video games developed in Japan
Video games set in the 2040s